Mayr-Melnhof Karton AG is a manufacturer in the paper and packaging industry, based in Vienna, Austria.
The company is 65% family owned, with the rest free-float, and is listed on the Vienna Stock Exchange (Wiener Börse).

Mayr-Melnhof packaging is a multi-national company with plants in Austria, Chile, Germany, France, the United Kingdom, Iran, Jordan, the Netherlands, Poland, Romania, Russia, Slovenia, Spain, Turkey, Tunisia, Ukraine, and Vietnam.

Mayr-Melnhof in the UK
Mayr-Melnhof had two plants in Great Britain, one based in Bootle, Merseyside and one in Deeside Wales. The Bootle plant worked closely with companies including Kellogg Company, while the operations at Deeside focus mainly upon food and tissue manufacturing for companies including Georgia-Pacific and Unilever. Both plants ran a weekday 3-shift system as well as a dedicated weekend crew.

At both UK plants, the company ran mainly Bobst group machinery in the cut-and-crease and finishing department, the Bootle plant operated a fully automated end of line department. In the print department of both, machinery from Koenig & Bauer was used.

History
Owner Franz Mayr (1810–1889) was ennobled in 1859 with the title "Edler of Melnhof". Since then the family was styled Mayr von Melnhof. In 1872 Franz Mayr, Edler von Melnhof received the hereditary title of Baron in Austria, for him and his legitimate male-line descendants.

References

Bootle plant closed in 2012 due to extended industrial action
https://web.archive.org/web/20140202234224/http://www.mayr-melnhof.com/en/media-center/press-releases/newsdetails/450.html

External links

Vienna Stock Exchange: Market Data Mayr-Melnhof Karton AG

Manufacturing companies based in Vienna
Packaging companies of Austria
Pulp and paper companies of Austria
Manufacturing companies established in 1950
Austrian brands
Austrian companies established in 1950